Chen Chun (1483–1544), courtesy name Daofu and art name Baiyang Shanren, was a Ming Dynasty artist, calligrapher, and poet. Born into a wealthy family of scholar-officials in Suzhou, he learned calligraphy from Wen Zhengming, one of the Four Masters of the Ming dynasty. Chen Chun later broke with Wen to favor a more freestyle method of ink wash painting. He was associated with the Wu School of literary painting.  Mi Fu of the Song Dynasty had a strong influence on his work. Chen executed many landscapes, but to a degree is noted as a "Bird-and-flower" painter.

External links

Painting Gallery of Chen Chun at China Online Museum
China culture page
Painting 188
Works in the collection of the Metropolitan Museum, New York

1483 births
1544 deaths
Ming dynasty landscape painters
Painters from Suzhou
Ming dynasty calligraphers
16th-century Chinese calligraphers
Ming dynasty poets
Poets from Jiangsu
Writers from Suzhou